Cox  Lake is a lake located southeast of Port Alberni, British Columbia. It is named after the Cox family, who lived at Cape Beale lighthouse in the 1870s.

References

Alberni Valley
Lakes of Vancouver Island
Alberni Land District